The Methuen Police Department (MPD) has the primary responsibility for law enforcement and investigation within the city of Methuen, Massachusetts.

Rank structure
Chief of Police
Deputy Chief - The rank of Deputy Chief was eliminated on March 1, 2008, with the retirement of Deputy Police Chief Joseph Alaimo.
Captains
Lieutenants
Sergeants
Patrolmen

Police Chiefs
Cyril Feugill about 1958?
Christopher H. Devine
Francis J Morse 1972 to 1985 Retired June 1985 Died: February 7, 1986
Donald DeSantis  Appointed:  July 1, 1985, retired: April 1, 1995 Died: June 5, 2007
Bruce A. MacDougall (Methuen Police 1975 — 2002 (27 years)) Appointed Chief:1995  Retired:2002
Joseph E. Solomon Appointed:2002  Removed: May 7, 2008 Reinstated: Oct 1, 2010

Layoffs in 2019
On January 24, 2019, the department started laying off 50 officers (more than half, since there were 95 to begin with) because of a contract dispute. If the pay raises in question had gone into effect, Methuen would have overspent its budget, which is illegal in Massachusetts.  This led to an investigation by the Inspector General of Massachusetts who concluded that approving the 2017 contract “likely violated state and municipal laws ... and failed to comply with their own municipal rules and breached their fiduciary duties to the residents of Methuen.”

See also

 List of law enforcement agencies in Massachusetts

References

External links
Methuen Public Corruption Allegations

Municipal police departments of Massachusetts
Methuen, Massachusetts